The Venture Bros. ran for seven seasons. The first three seasons consisted of 13 thirty-minute episodes (including time for commercials), plus the pilot and one 15-minute Christmas special. The fourth season consisted of 15 thirty-minute episodes and one hour-long season finale episode, while the fifth season had an hour-long premiere, a thirty-minute halloween special and 7 thirty-minute episodes.

During the first three seasons, Adult Swim originally broadcast several episodes out of narrative order. The DVD releases presented the episodes in the order intended by Jackson Publick and Doc Hammer. Beginning with season four, the network had debuted new episodes in the correct order. An hour-long special titled "All This and Gargantua-2" aired January 19, 2015, as a precursor to season 6, although the Adult Swim website's video on demand section considered the episode to be the first episode of season 6. In January 2016 the sixth season, consisting of eight episodes, began airing and being made available on various digital platforms on consecutive Sunday evenings. The seventh and final season began airing in August 2018, with the season consisting of ten episodes.

On May 12, 2021, it was announced a direct-to-video film is currently in production. The film will act as a finale to the series.

Series overview

Episodes

Pilot (2003)

Season 1 (2004)

Special (2004)

Season 2 (2006)

Season 3 (2008)

Season 4 (2009–10)

Special (2011)

Special (2012)

Season 5 (2013)

Special (2015)

Season 6 (2016)

Season 7 (2018)

References

External links
 
 

Episodes
Lists of American adult animated television series episodes
Lists of American comedy-drama television series episodes